Miyatake (written: 宮武) is a Japanese surname. Notable people with the surname include:

, Japanese writer, journalist and media historian
, Japanese mechanical designer
, Japanese-American photographer

Japanese-language surnames